Andrea Cristiano (born 15 July 1984) is an Italian footballer who plays for Italian club Ghivizzano Borgoamozzano.

Cristiano extended his contract with AlbinoLeffe to 30 June 2011 in December 2007.

On 31 August 2010 he left for fellow Serie B team Ascoli Calcio 1898. On the same day he renewed his contract until 2014. However, on 22 June 2011 Ascoli decided not to sign him outright.

On 12 August 2013, Cristiano joined Varese on a two-year deal.

References

External links
 
 

1984 births
Living people
Italian footballers
Serie B players
F.C. Pro Vercelli 1892 players
U.C. AlbinoLeffe players
Novara F.C. players
Ascoli Calcio 1898 F.C. players
Empoli F.C. players
S.S.D. Varese Calcio players
Association football midfielders